The Monarch is a  mountain summit located in the Ball Range of the Canadian Rockies in British Columbia, Canada. The Monarch is situated on the boundary between Kootenay National Park and Mount Assiniboine Provincial Park, four kilometres to the west side of the Continental Divide. Although not visible from roads, The Monarch is a prominent feature seen from the slopes above Sunshine Village ski resort. Its nearest higher peak is Mount Bourgeau,  to the north-northeast.

History

The first ascent of the mountain was made in 1913 by Conrad Kain with Interprovincial Boundary Survey. In a report by the Interprovincial Boundary Survey, the mountain is referred to as Monarch Mountain, a fine piece of mountain architecture dominating the Simpson Pass area.

The mountain's toponym was officially adopted in 1924 by the Geographical Names Board of Canada.

Geology

The Monarch is composed of sedimentary rock laid down during the Precambrian to Jurassic periods. Formed in shallow seas, this sedimentary rock was pushed east and over the top of younger rock during the Laramide orogeny.

Climate

Based on the Köppen climate classification, the mountain is located in a subarctic climate zone with cold, snowy winters, and mild summers. Winter temperatures can drop below −20 °C with wind chill factors below −30 °C. Precipitation runoff from The Monarch drains into tributaries of the Simpson River, which is a tributary of the Vermilion River.

Gallery

See also
List of mountains of Canada
Geography of British Columbia

References

External links
 Kootenay National Park Parks Canada web site
 The Monarch weather: Mountain Forecast

The Monarch
The Monarch
Kootenay Land District